"I Love You More Today" is a song written by L. E. White, and recorded by American country music artist Conway Twitty.  It was released in April 1969 as the first single and title track from the album I Love You More Today.  The song was Twitty's second number one on the country charts.  The single spent a single week at the top and a total of 15 weeks on the country chart.

Chart performance

References

1969 singles
1969 songs
Conway Twitty songs
Songs written by L. E. White
Song recordings produced by Owen Bradley
Decca Records singles